Bocchigliero (Calabrian:  or ) is a town and comune in the province of Cosenza in the Calabria region of southern Italy.

Sources

Cities and towns in Calabria